Garuda Indonesian Airways Flight 150 was a scheduled Indonesian domestic passenger flight from Kemayoran Airport, Jakarta to Sultan Mahmud Badaruddin II Airport, Palembang. On 24 September 1975, Flight 150 crashed on approach due to poor weather and fog just  from the town of Palembang. The accident killed 25 out of the 61 passengers and crew on board, and one person on the ground.

Aircraft
The Fokker F-28 Fellowship registration PK-GVC was built in 1971 and had done over 1000 hours of flying time before the fatal accident.

Accident
Garuda Indonesian Airways Flight 150 took off from Kemayoran Airport on a short-haul flight to Sultan Mahmud Badaruddin II Airport with 61 passengers and crew on board. Less than 1 hour after take off, Flight 150 was cleared by the air traffic controllers at Sultan Mahmud Badaruddin II Airport to start their approach to land on runway 28 (now as runway 29). The flaps and landing gear were down as flight 150 was nearing the airport when fog started shadowing the town and the airport. Flight 150 entered the fog two minutes later. The tail end of the aircraft hit trees and crashed breaking it up into 2 parts. There was no fire when flight 150 crashed. The crash killed 25 people on board and 1 person on the ground. 36 passengers survived the crash and were taken to a local hospital.

Cause
An investigation into the crash found that the visual flight in weather conditions below minimums. Flight 150 was in a downwind leg as the aircraft was on approach to the airport in fog. It is unknown why the air traffic controller did not tell the pilots of Flight 150 to execute a missed approach or why the pilots themselves did not execute a missed approach.

See also
Ariana Afghan Airlines Flight 701

External links 
Accident description – Aviation Safety Network
Accident details  – planecrashinfo.com

1975 in Indonesia
Accidents and incidents involving the Fokker F28
Airliner accidents and incidents caused by weather
Aviation accidents and incidents in 1975
Aviation accidents and incidents in Indonesia
Flight 150
September 1975 events in Asia